Irun is a railway station in Irun, Basque Country, Spain. The station is located on the Bordeaux - Irun, Bilbao - Hendaye and Madrid–Hendaye railway lines. The station is served by TGV (high speed trains) operated by the SNCF and Alvia (High Speed Trains), Talgo, Arco, Estrella and Cercanías San Sebastián services operated by RENFE.

The electric pickup supply also changes here from 3000 V DC (overhead Spain) to 1500 V DC (overhead France). Between the stations of Hendaye and Irun, both track gauges run together.

Train services
The following services currently call at Irun:

References

External links

RENFE

Railway stations in Gipuzkoa
Irun